"Sekai wa Sore o Ai to Yobundaze" (世界はそれを愛と呼ぶんだぜ lit. That's What the World Calls Love) is the Japanese rock band Sambomaster's fifth single. 

It was the Japanese drama Densha Otoko's ending song, it was featured on the Hataraki Man soundtrack and was covered in the INiS rhythm video game Moero! Nekketsu Rhythm Damashii Osu! Tatakae! Ouendan 2 as the finale song. It was also covered in Konami's Bemani series, Drummania and Guitarfreaks. In 2007, Japanese singer 'bird' released a remix album, "BIRDSONG EP -cover BESTS for the party-" featuring a jazz-hiphop remix of "Sekai wa Sore o Ai to Yobundaze".

It sold 126,885 units, making it the #76 single on the Oricon top 100 for 2005.

Track listing
 Sekai wa Sore o Ai to Yobundaze
 Atsui Suna to Warui Ame
 Boku ni Sasagu

References

2005 singles
Sambomaster songs
Japanese television drama theme songs
2005 songs
Song articles with missing songwriters